Theulf (died 20 October 1123) was a medieval Bishop of Worcester.

Life
Theulf was a canon of Bayeux Cathedral and a king's chaplain before he was nominated to the see of Worcester on 28 December 1113. He was consecrated on 27 June 1115. He died on 20 October 1123. The medieval chronicler William of Malmesbury claimed that Theulf confessed on his deathbed that he had purchased his bishopric.

Citations

References
 
 British History Online Bishops of Worcester accessed on 3 November 2007
 

Bishops of Worcester
1123 deaths
12th-century English Roman Catholic bishops
Year of birth unknown